Flat Rock is an unincorporated community in Powhatan County, in the U.S. state of Virginia.   Flatrock was a stop on the Farmville and Powhatan Railroad from 1884 to 1905 and then on the Tidewater and Western Railroad from 1905 to 1917.

References

Unincorporated communities in Virginia
Unincorporated communities in Powhatan County, Virginia